Northamptonshire is a county in the East Midlands of England. It is bordered by Warwickshire, Leicestershire, Rutland, Lincolnshire, Cambridgeshire, Bedfordshire, Buckinghamshire and Oxfordshire. It was governed by Northamptonshire County Council and seven district and borough councils, Corby, Daventry, East Northamptonshire, Kettering, Northampton, South Northamptonshire and Wellingborough until April 2021 when North Northamptonshire and West Northamptonshire unitary authorities were formed. The county flower is the cowslip.

A ridge of low Jurassic hills runs through the county, separating the basins of the Welland and Nene rivers. The county has good communications as it is crossed by two main railway lines and the M1 motorway, and it has many small industrial centres rather than large conurbations. The main architectural feature is its country houses and mansions.

As of May 2017, there are 18 local nature reserves in Northamptonshire, and there is public access to all sites. Twelve are managed by the Wildlife Trust for Bedfordshire, Cambridgeshire and Northamptonshire, and two are also Sites of Special Scientific Interest, Ramsar internationally important wetland sites, and Special Protection Areas under the European Union Directive on the Conservation of Wild Birds. The smallest is Great Oakley Meadow, which has prominent surviving ridge and furrow from the medieval ploughing system.

Other classifications

 Ramsar = Ramsar site
 SPA = Special Protection Area
 SSSI = Site of Special Scientific Interest
 WTBCN = Wildlife Trust for Bedfordshire, Cambridgeshire and Northamptonshire

Sites

See also
List of Sites of Special Scientific Interest in Northamptonshire

Notes

References

 
Northamptonshire
Northamptonshire-related lists